Mette Kongshem (born 7 May 1941) is a Norwegian diplomat and politician for the Conservative Party.

She was born in Oslo, and is a cand.mag. by education. She started working for the Norwegian Ministry of Foreign Affairs in 1976. From 1981 to 1983, she served as a State Secretary in the Ministry of Trade as a part of the first cabinet Willoch. She was then a counsellor at the Norwegian embassy in the United States from 1983 to 1990, before returning to the Norwegian Ministry of Foreign Affairs. She was the Norwegian ambassador to the Czech Republic from 1996 to 1999, deputy under-secretary of state in the Ministry of Foreign Affairs from 1999 to 2002, Norwegian ambassador to the Organization for Security and Co-operation in Europe from 2002 to 2006, and Norwegian ambassador to Central Asia from 2006.

References

1941 births
Living people
Diplomats from Oslo
Ambassadors of Norway to the Czech Republic
Ambassadors of Norway to Kazakhstan
Ambassadors of Norway to Kyrgyzstan
Ambassadors of Norway to Tajikistan
Ambassadors of Norway to Turkmenistan
Ambassadors of Norway to Uzbekistan
Conservative Party (Norway) politicians
Norwegian state secretaries
Norwegian women ambassadors
Politicians from Oslo